Wojciech Sobala (born 12 May 1988) is a Polish volleyball player. At the professional club level, he plays for Steaua București.

Sporting achievements

Clubs
 CEV Challenge Cup
  2011/2012 – with AZS Częstochowa
 National championships
 2009/2010  Polish Cup, with Jastrzębski Węgiel

References

External links
 
 Player profile at PlusLiga.pl 
 Player profile at Volleybox.net

1988 births
Living people
People from Sosnowiec
Polish men's volleyball players
Polish expatriate sportspeople in France
Expatriate volleyball players in France
Polish expatriate sportspeople in Romania
Expatriate volleyball players in Romania
Jastrzębski Węgiel players
AZS Częstochowa players
AZS Olsztyn players
BBTS Bielsko-Biała players
GKS Katowice (volleyball) players
LKPS Lublin players
Middle blockers